Caygill is a surname. Notable people with the surname include:

 Alex Caygill (born 1940), English golfer
 David Caygill (born 1948), New Zealand politician
 Howard Caygill (born 1958), British philosopher
 Josh Caygill (born 1989), British racing driver

See also
 Cargill (surname)